This is a list of schools who field men's basketball teams in Division I of the National Collegiate Athletic Association (NCAA) in the United States. By definition, all schools in this grouping have varsity basketball teams. All of the listed schools also field women's basketball teams except for The Citadel and VMI, both military colleges that were all-male until the 1990s and remain overwhelmingly male today.

There are 352 schools that are full members of 32 Division I basketball conferences or independent, plus ten more that are in transition from NCAA Division II and one also in transition from NCAA Division III, and are members of Division I conferences. Another current Division I school has announced a planned transition to Division III in 2023–24. Basketball conference affiliations represents those of the 2022–23 NCAA basketball season.

Alaska is the only state without a Division I basketball program, but they do have two Division II programs: the Alaska–Anchorage Seawolves and the Alaska Nanooks (the latter representing the University of Alaska's original Fairbanks campus).

Programs

See also

 List of current NCAA Division I men's basketball coaches
 List of NCAA Division I basketball arenas
 NCAA Division I men's basketball alignment history
Link to Google Maps of all 363 home arenas

Notes

References

N
Base